The 2018 European Canoe Slalom Championships took place in Prague, Czech Republic under the auspices of the European Canoe Association (ECA). It was the 19th edition of the competition and Prague hosted the event for the first time. The events took place at the Prague-Troja Canoeing Centre from 1 to 3 June 2018.

The men's C2 event made its last appearance at major international competitions after the ICF had decided to pull this event out of the World Cup and World Championship program.

Medal summary

Men

Canoe

Kayak

Women

Canoe

Kayak

Medal table

References

External links 
 European Canoe Association
 Official website

European Canoe Slalom Championships
European Canoe Slalom Championships
European Canoe Slalom Championships
2018 in Czech sport
Sports competitions in Prague
International sports competitions hosted by the Czech Republic